The Young Rajah is a 1922 silent film starring Rudolph Valentino. The film was based on the book Amos Judd by John Ames Mitchell.

Plot
After fifteen years, Joshua Judd (Charles Ogle) tells his adopted son, Amos (Valentino), that his real father was an Indian maharajah overthrown by Ali Khan (Bertram Grassby). Amos, then a young boy (played by an uncredited Pat Moore), was rescued by General Devi Das Gadi (George Periolat) and taken to America for his safety. (Joshua's merchant brother had been a trusted friend of the late maharajah.)

Amos attends Harvard University. There he incurs the hatred of Austin Slade, Jr. (Jack Giddings), whom he beats out for a spot on the rowing team. At a party celebrating a rowing victory over arch-rival Yale, a jealous Slade calls Amos "yellow" and pours a drink on him, causing Amos to punch him. Slade grabs a chair as a weapon, but Amos ducks, and Slade falls through an open window to his death. Amos is cleared of all wrongdoing, but the newspaper story attracts the notice of Amhad Beg (J. Farrell MacDonald), Ali Khan's Prime Minister.

That summer, at a party hosted by close friend Stephen Van Kovert (William Boyd), Amos becomes attracted to one of the other guests, Molly Cabot (Wanda Hawley). By chance, Molly and her family decide to vacation in Amos's hometown. As they become better acquainted, Amos overcomes Molly's initial dislike of him. However, Molly tells her father (Edward Jobson) that she cannot marry someone who is not one of her "own people", however much she loves him. Instead, she agrees to marry longtime suitor Horace Bennett (Robert Ober), who had been a good friend of Slade's. Bennett tells Amos to stay away from his future wife, but when he also calls Amos a murderer, Amos chokes him into apologizing. As he leaves, Amos is struck in the head by a rock thrown by Bennett. Seeing this, Molly rushes to Amos's side and breaks off her engagement to Bennett.
 
The happy couple decide on an early wedding, but Amos has a vision showing him being murdered the day before. He has had visions before; all came true, even if he tried to prevent them. His family is supposedly descended from Prince Arjuna; the god Krishna granted Arjuna and all his descendants the gift of prophesy. When he reveals this to his future father-in-law (who has already witnessed the accuracy of Amos's visions), the latter suggests he lock himself away in the sanatorium of a friend for the day.

Amos does so, but Amhad Beg and his men find and kidnap him. Just as they are about to kill him, Amos is rescued by the mystic Narada (Josef Swickard), who also can see into the future, and his followers. Narada convinces him to forgo his own happiness and return to India to overthrow the tyrant. When Amos is welcomed by his people and the army revolts, Ali Khan commits suicide. The new Maharajah of Dharmagar takes comfort in his latest vision, which shows his wedding to Molly.

Cast
Rudolph Valentino as Amos Judd
Wanda Hawley as Molly Cabot
Pat Moore as Amos as a Child
Charles Ogle as Joshua Judd
Fanny Midgley as Sarah Judd
Robert Ober as Horace Bennett
Jack Giddings as Austin Slade, Jr.
Edward Jobson as John Cabot
Josef Swickard as Narada
Bertram Grassby as Maharajah Ali Khan
J. Farrell MacDonald as Amhad Beg
George Periolat as General Devi Das Gadi
George Field as Prince Rajanya Paikparra Munsingh
Maude Wayne as Miss Elsie Van Kovert
William Boyd as Stephen Van Kovert
Joseph Harrington as Dr. Fettiplace
Spottiswoode Aitken as Caleb
Julanne Johnston as Dancing Girl (uncredited)

Reception

This film was one of Valentino's most commercially and critically unsuccessful motion pictures. Photoplay described it as "The glamorous Rodolph Valentino's latest—and worst—vehicle." The film is perhaps best remembered today for its elaborate and suggestive costumes, which were designed by Valentino's wife Natacha Rambova. Photographs of Valentino wearing these outfits, some of which left little to the imagination, are still widely circulated today.

Restored version
For most of the twentieth century, The Young Rajah was considered a lost film. However, in 2005, Turner Classic Movies announced that they were financing the restoration of the surviving footage of the picture, and the channel aired the resulting program in May 2006. The movie was assembled from  poor-quality film clips and still photos, with additional title screens being added to bridge the gaps in the storyline. In addition, some intertitles were taken from a Spanish-language edition, and these were translated and replaced with new title screens.

References
Notes

Bibliography
Dark Lover: The life and death of Rudolph Valentino. Emily W. Leider, Farrar, Straus and Giroux, 2003,

External links

TCM: History of the Film Fragment and Restoration

The Young Rajah at SilentEra

1923 review from Motion Picture magazine

1922 films
American silent feature films
American black-and-white films
Films based on American novels
Films directed by Phil Rosen
American romantic drama films
1920s rediscovered films
1922 romantic drama films
Rediscovered American films
1920s American films
Silent romantic drama films
Silent American drama films